Bill George is a former American football coach.  He served as the head football coach at the United States Coast Guard Academy in New London, Connecticut from 1999 to 2019, compiling a record of 75–126.  His two best seasons were 2006 and 2007, with the Bears making the New England Football Conference (NEFC) championship in both years.  George made minor headlines in October 2013 for washing his players underwear during the federal government shutdown.  After the Coast Guard Academy defeated United States Merchant Marine Academy in 2014, George jumped into the Thames River.  On November 12, 2019, George announced he was retiring from coaching in order "to do some things."

Head coaching record

References

External links
 Coast Guard profile

Year of birth missing (living people)
Living people
American football centers
Coast Guard Bears football coaches
Ithaca Bombers football coaches
Ithaca Bombers football players
Ohio State Buckeyes football coaches
Princeton Tigers football coaches